Aphyllocladus denticulatus is a plant species in the Asteraceae. The species is native to the interior valleys of Chile. The species lives in dry habitat with extremely limited rainfall.

A chemical study of the species found that it produces the compound 5-Methylcoumarin, which has only been previously discovered in members of the Asteraceae subtribe Mutisiinae.

References 

Onoserideae
Flora of Chile